Doru Bratu (born 27 May 1989 in Bucharest) is a Romanian professional footballer who plays as a defender for Liga II side Sportul Snagov.

Honours
Steaua București
Liga I: 2012–13
Supercupa României: 2013

References

External links

Footballers from Bucharest
1989 births
Living people
Romanian footballers
Association football defenders
Liga I players
Liga II players
FC Rapid București players
ASC Daco-Getica București players
CS Concordia Chiajna players
FC Steaua București players
CS Pandurii Târgu Jiu players
FC Universitatea Cluj players
FCV Farul Constanța players
CS Sportul Snagov players
AS Voința Snagov players